Bushenyi is a town in Western Uganda. It is the 'chief town' of Bushenyi District and the district headquarters are located there. The district is named after the town, in keeping with the practice in most of the districts in the country.

Location

The coordinates of the town are 0°32'30.0"S 30°11'16.0"E (Latitude:-0.541667; Longitude:30.187778).

Population
The 2002 the national census enumerated the combined population of Bushenyi-Ishaka Metropolitan Area at 37,664. In 2014, the national population census put the population of Bushenyi, including Ishaka, at 41,217. In 2020, the statistics agency estimated the mid-year population of the town at 43,700 inhabitants. UBOS calculated that the population of this town expanded at an average rate of 1.01 percent annually, between 2014 and 2020.

Points of interest
The following points of interest lie in the town or near the town limits: (a) the headquarters of Bushenyi District Administration (b) the offices of Bushenyi–Ishaka Town Council (c) Bushenyi Central Market, the largest source of fresh produce in the town.

Also located here is Ishaka Adventist Hospital, a 120-bed health facility administered by the Adventist Church.

National Social Security Fund, maintains a branch in this town. A number of Ugandan commercial banks, including Centenary Bank, Finance Trust Bank, DFCU Bank and Stanbic Bank Uganda maintain branches in the town.

The Western Campus of Kampala International University, including its 500-bed teaching hospital, are located here. Other notable educational institutions include Bweranyangi Girls' Senior Secondary School, a residential all-girls middle and high school and Uganda Technical College, Bushenyi.

Four national roads; (a) Mbarara–Ishaka Road (b) Kikorongo–Ishaka Road (c) Ishaka–Kagamba Road and (d) Kashenyi–Mitooma Road confluence in the town of Ishaka, in the Bushenyi–Ishaka Municipality.

See also
 List of cities and towns in Uganda

References

External links
 Attractions in Bushenyi
 Water governance in small towns at the rural-urban intersection: the case of Bushenyi-Ishaka, Uganda As of March 2018.

Populated places in Western Region, Uganda
Cities in the Great Rift Valley
Bushenyi District
Ankole sub-region